The canton of Boulogne-sur-Mer-2 is an administrative division of the Pas-de-Calais department, in northern France. It was created at the French canton reorganisation which came into effect in March 2015. Its seat is in Boulogne-sur-Mer.

It consists of the following communes: 
Baincthun 
Boulogne-sur-Mer (partly)
Echinghen
Le Portel
Saint-Martin-Boulogne

References

Cantons of Pas-de-Calais